State Road 193 (NM 193) is a  state highway in the US state of New Mexico. NM 193's southern terminus is at U.S. Route 56 (US 56) east of Springer, and the northern terminus is at US 64/US 87 east of Raton. A 12.8-mile portion of it is surfaced with gravel.

Major intersections

See also

References

193
Transportation in Colfax County, New Mexico